This is a list of famous historical figures diagnosed with or strongly suspected as having had syphilis at some time. Many people who acquired syphilis were treated and recovered; some died from it.

Many famous historical figures, including Charles VIII of France, Christopher Columbus, Hernán Cortés of Spain, Benito Mussolini, and Ivan the Terrible, were often alleged to have had syphilis or other sexually transmitted infections. Sometimes these allegations were false and formed part of a political whispering campaign. In other instances, retrospective diagnoses of suspected cases have been made in modern times. Mental illness caused by late-stage syphilis was once a common form of dementia. This was known as the general paresis of the insane.

References

Infections with a predominantly sexual mode of transmission
Medical lists
History of medicine
Cases
Retrospective diagnosis
Deaths from syphilis